Happy Sad may refer to: 

 Happy Sad (album), a 1969 album from singer-songwriter Tim Buckley
 "Happy Sad" (song), a 2005 song by Gemma Hayes 
 The Happy Sad, a 2013 Rodney Evans film
 "Happy Sad", a 2018 single by Ocean Alley, from the album Chiaroscuro
 "Happy/Sad", a song from the musical 'The Addams Family
 "Happy & Sad", a 2018 song by Kacey Musgraves from Golden Hour